John Kemp (28 October 1952 – 9 May 2017) was a South African cricketer. He played in three first-class matches for Border in 1975/76 and 1976/77. His father John Miles Kemp also played for Border, and his son Justin Kemp played international cricket for South Africa.

See also
 List of Border representative cricketers

References

External links
 

1952 births
2017 deaths
South African cricketers
Border cricketers
People from Queenstown, South Africa
Cricketers from the Eastern Cape